It s right place Podu Gowda palem is a small Village/hamlet in Kruttivennu Mandal in Krishna District of Andhra Pradesh State, India. It comes under Pedana Constituency Nidamarru Panchayath. It belongs to Andhra region . It is located 46 KM towards East from District head quarters Machilipatnam. 5 KM from Kruthivennu. 391 KM from State capital Hyderabad

Podu Gowda palem Pin code is 521324 and postal head office is Bantumilli .

Padatadika ( 4 KM ) , Chinagollapalem ( 6 KM ) , Garisepudi ( 6 KM ) , Seethanapalli ( 8 KM ) , Matlam ( 9 KM ) are the nearby Villages to Podu Gowda palem. Podu Gowda palem is surrounded by Mogalthur Mandal towards East , Kalla Mandal towards North , Bhimavaram Mandal towards North , Kalidindi Mandal towards west .

Mogalthur , Bhimavaram , Narasapur , Palacole are the near by Cities to Podu Gowda palem.

This Place is in the border of the Krishna District and West Godavari District. West Godavari District Kalla is North towards this place . It is near to bay of bengal. There is a chance of humidity in the weather.podu Gowda palem good Village

References
Villages in Krishna district